This is a list of places of worship in the town of Framingham, Massachusetts. All institutions are listed in alphabetical order by faith, denomination and facility.

Christian

Baptist
Bible Baptist Church
Brazilian Baptist Church
First Baptist Church
New Bethel Baptist Church
New Jerusalem Baptist Church
South Middlesex Baptist Church
Temple Baptist Church
Zion MetroWest Church

Catholic
 Marist House Retreat
 St. Bridget's Church
 St. George's Church
 St. Jeremiah's Church
 St. Stephen's Church
 St. Tarcisius' Church

Christian Science
First Church of Christ, Scientist

Episcopal
 St. Andrew's Episcopal Church

Interdenominational
 Greater Framigham Community Church

Jehovah's Witness
Framingham Spanish Congregation of Jehovah's Witness

Lutheran
 Lutheran Church of Framingham

Methodist
First Methodist Of Saxonville
First United Methodist Church
Wesley United Methodist Church

Non-denominational
 Crossroads Community Church 
 Haven of Hope

Orthodox Christian
 Albanian Orthodox Church of the Annunciation
 Armenian Church of Metro West
 Holy Translators Armenian Church
 Parish of St John of Shanghai and San Francisco the Miracle Worker (Russian Orthodox)

Presbyterian (PCA)
 New Life Presbyterian church

Quaker
 Friends Meeting House

Reformed Church in America (RCA)
 Boston Taiwanese Christian Church

Seventh-day Adventist Church
 Framingham Portuguese Seventh-day Adventist Church
 Framingham Spanish Seventh-day Adventist Church
 Seventh-day Adventist Church

United Church of Christ
Edwards Church
 Grace Congregational
Pilgrim Meeting Center 
Plymouth Church

Other

 Assembly Of Christian Churches Of Framingham
 Beacon Community Church
 Brazilian Community Christian Church
 Church of the Nazarene
 Community Church
 Cornerstone Community Church
 Ebenezer Christian Church
 Elim Framingham Massachusetts - Located at 119 Herbert Street Framingham Massachusetts. Headquartered in San Salvador El Salvador. Born on October 3, 2014 at 125 Irving Street.
 First Assembly of God - Originally known as "Pentecostal Church of Framingham", incorporated in 1922. Originally located at Hartford and C Streets, the church purchased the former United Auto Workers union hall located at 32 South Street in downtown Framingham in 1994. The (former) Assemblies of God New England District and a Bible School were located on Route 9 in Framingham Center until their sale in 1957. First Assembly of God of Framingham is affiliated with the General Council of the Assemblies of God in the United States of America, headquartered in Springfield, Missouri, and the Southern New England District of the Assemblies of God, located in Charlton, Massachusetts.
 First Church
 First Parish in Framingham (Unitarian Universalist)
 Framingham Christ Reformed Church
 Framingham Church of God in Christ
 Getzemani Defend of Christ
 Grace Evangelical Free Church of Framingham
 Our Lady of Fatima Church
 Salvation Army - maintains a presence in Framingham's downtown by not only offering religious services, but also to care for Framingham's homeless population
 Sons of Mary Missionary Society
 Southern New Eng Conf Assoc Seventh Day Adventists
 World Revival Church Assembly of God

Islamic
Masjid-Basheer -  part of the Islamic Society of Framingham

Jewish
 Chabad-Lubavitch of Framingham
 Congregation Bais Chabad
 Temple Beth Am (Reform)
 Temple Beth Sholom (Conservative)

References

MetroWest

Framingham
Massachusetts-related lists